Böblingen Airport  was built in the mid-1920s for the city of Stuttgart in Germany. Bordered by Calwer Straße (K1073) and the E41, it lies northwest of Böblingen and south of the Daimler factory in Sindelfingen. An aircraft industry developed around this airfield, which was used by the military during the Second World War.  On September 1, 1939 the airbase was the home station for the I/JG 52 (1st Group of Jagdgeschwader 52) which was flying the Bf109 E-1 fighter aircraft.  On that day its strength was 39 aircraft.

Post-war history
After the Second World War, the airfield was transferred to US Armed Forces, which used it as a maintenance facility and heliport until the mid-1990s. During this period, in the late 1960s and the early 1970s, its airfield was used to stage air shows.

In the 1950s and 1960s the airport was the home base of the Boeblingen FlugSport Gruppe.  This  group was very active in light general aviation and gliding.

The airfield has fallen into disrepair since the mid-1990s and many of its buildings were demolished once the armory was cleaned up. The old control tower, some hangars and some miscellaneous buildings still exist. New building projects are, however, being planned for the area and the airfield is now called Böblingen/Sindelfingen Airfield.

In 2009 the old control tower was converted into a hotel, and the hangars are now part of Motorworld Stuttgart (formerly known as Meilenwerk Stuttgart), an automobile museum.

References

External links 

 
 

Luftwaffe bases
Defunct airports in Germany
Buildings and structures in Böblingen
Airports in Baden-Württemberg